Salaš Noćajski (Салаш Ноћајски) is a village in Serbia, near more known village Noćaj. It is located in the Sremska Mitrovica municipality, in the Srem District, Vojvodina province. The village has a Serb ethnic majority and its population numbering 1,879 people (2002 census). Although part of the Srem District, Salaš Noćajski is situated in the region of Mačva.

Historical population

1961: 2,212
1971: 1,829
1981: 1,876
1991: 1,894

Notable citizens
Stojan Čupić, one of the leaders of the First Serbian Uprising.

See also
List of places in Serbia
List of cities, towns and villages in Vojvodina

References
Slobodan Ćurčić, Broj stanovnika Vojvodine, Novi Sad, 1996.

Mačva
Populated places in Vojvodina
Sremska Mitrovica